Basian, also known as Abbasian, is a town in Abbottabad District of Khyber Pakhtunkhwa province of Pakistan, it is located at 34°04′24″N 73°29′41″E and has an average elevation of 660 metres (2168 feet).

The population of Abbasian is 1,580, many of whom are among the most wealthy in Khyber-Pakhtunkhwa. This place was the first home of Ratten Khan, whose real name was Sardar Abdur Rehaman, an ancestor of the Ratnal Dhunds of Birote and Abbasian. An old cemetery tells the stories of tribes centuries before. Abbasian also has a very beautiful mosque, Masjid-e-Abbasian, similar to the Al-Faisal Mosque of Islamabad but without minarets (which were removed after 2005 earthquake) and a Quranic school. There are two private schools and one primary and middle government schools for both sexes.

Background
Basian is the last end of Union Council Birote and populated town of union council with majority of Mojwal and Andwal sub tribe of Dhund Abbasies. Other tribes are Qureshies, Awans (not Alvi Awan), Gujjars and Jadoons. The word BASIAN is derived from a landlord named BASS KHAN of primitive era of Circle Bakote when Dhund Abbasi tribe first populated here. Who was Bass Khan? Basian, UC Birote He was a land lord of this town in 14th century, as narrated in an old verse of local Dhundi/Kerheali language by Imteaz Abbasi son of Iqbal Khan of Basian.

متے خانے تخت ہزارہ، باس خانے باسیاں
ست ناڑے درے اگیں ، سبھے گلاں راسیاں

Background of verse
It was time in 16th century, very wast landed were possessed by land owners as Nikoder Khan, Fateh Khan, Khan Dada, lahr Khan and others. Bass Khan was a land lord among others. Matta Khan was in Lora and his blood relations with Numbel's land lords. Once he sent his workers as Mirasi or Nai for new blood relationship at Numbel but Numbel Sardars not entertained them. They returned and stayed at Bass Khan at night. His peasants inquired these people about their travel in Basian and they narrated all story about Matta Khan and Numble's Sardars. Peasants urgently informed Bass Khan the whole story and he ordered for royal reception of peasants of Matta Khan. They surprised but understood strategy of their host. Next day peasants held a friendship package along new relationship as his daughter was as daughter in Law of Matta Khan. This was first blood relation that tied up between Basian (UC Birote now) and Lora. Bass Khan was an influential Chief (of Dhund Abbasies or Kethwals), so this village was named as BASIAN after his death.

Notable people
Muhammad Yaqoob Khan Abbasi (Kashmir Movement leader) and Grandfather of Sajid Quresh Abbasi (Presently امیر جماعت اسلامی ضلع ایبٹ آباد) & Mujtaba Zamani Adv(Practicing Lawer Islamabad Highcourt), was renowned personality of region. He fought against Dogra troops defeating the m at Phagri Mahaz near Muzafarabad.  He was considered Qualified, Brave, Social and one of patriotic leaders of Abbottabad. He was awarded with title of Khadim-I-Deen for his contribution in the independence movement.
Sajid Quresh Abbasi, [MD Kohsar Foundation Schools] is a renowned educationalist, Social & political worker of the region. He has served as Naib Ameer Jamaat e Islami Abbottabad, General secretary JI Abbottabad & Ameer JI PK45. Currently, He is member of District Shura of Jamaat E Islami Abbottabad. He remained President of Islami Jamiat Talaba Muzzafarabad during his student life. He is renowned for his social welfare and religious activities. He is grandson of Sardar Yaqoob Khan Abbasi Shaheed.
Anwer Saeed Abbasi son of Fazil Khan of Basian was the first foreign qualified architectural engineer of Circle Bakote who designed the Shaheed-e-Millat Secretariat, Blue Area Islamabad. He also designed Facto Building Islamabad. He died a heart attack in 2005 and is buried in Basian.  He was the elder brother of Zakir Abbasi, ex chairman of All Teacher Association Circle Bakote.
Zafir Shah of Lower Basian was the first person who was punished during the rule of Zia ul Haq in Rawalpindi in 1980. All his property was seized and he was imprisoned for 30 months. He recovered his property and other assets in 1994 during Benazir Bhutto government.
 The first meeting of Ibrahim Khan and Sardar Qayume Khan was held in Basian at Dewan in 1948.  

Qazi Zafeer-ul-Haq Alvi Chishti was a religious scholar, teacher and hakeem (ayo vedic doctor).  His father Qazi Mohammed Zaman Qureshi migrated Chalattan, Birote Khurd in 1935 and settled at Thala.  He taught in High School Osia, Murree, Bakker and in 1951 he migrated to Rawalpindi with his family.  He was personal physician of late President General Zea-ul-haq in 1985 till his death and Teacher of Brig Muhammad Taj Abbasi, uncle of Federal Minister Shahid Khaqan Abbasi. Renowned poet and composer of Pakistan National Anthom Abu Al-Asar Hafeez Jullundhri was his close friend and stayed in his residence when he came to Rawalpindi.  He establish his herbal clinic at Pull Shah Nazar near Raja Bazar of Rawalpindi.  He died in 1997 and buried in Eid Gah graveyard in Rawalpindi. 
Muhammad Younas Abbasian [(AC) ASSISTANT COMMISSIONER] belongs to Basian performing duty in Skardu Baltistaan since 1975.  
Azad Khan is another renowned personality of Basian who was the second Chairman of Union Council of Bakote cum Birote during 1965–70.  He was a contractor and constructed third pillar of Kohala Bridge in 1953. He died in 1985.
Altaf hussain Abbasi, a very hard-working, self-made, resilient and well-off transporter of Basian, lives in Islamabad. He is a person with distinctive vision who himself, due to impromptu constraints, could not complete his education beyond matriculation but still invested his all energies and earnings to provide best professional education to his all children. According to him, his biggest feeling of achievement and satisfaction comes from his endeavor to educate his all children on highest level at best institutes. In this regard, he is a great source of inspiration for many others in the town.
Muhammad Khushnood Abbasian is the first notable bank officer from Basian. He served in Habib Bank for more than 32 years and retired as Assistant Vice President of Habib Bank (Murree Region). He is a trustworthy and softhearted person. His family is also among well educated families of Abbasian.
Dr. Nisar Ahmad Abbasian is the first ever person from this village to achieve a PhD degree in 2011. He studied at the primary and middle schools of Basian, bakote.com/gallery/p.php/22 High school Birote (Matriculation), Bahria College, Islamabad (F.Sc), University of Engineering and Technology, Peshawar  (B.E. electrical engineering) and The University of Sheffield, UK (M.E.) and PhD in electrical engineering. He is serving the nation as researcher in a renowned R&D setup.

References

Populated places in Abbottabad District